UFM1 specific peptidase 1 (inactive) is a protein that in humans is encoded by the UFSP1 gene.

Function

This gene encodes a protein that is similar to other Ufm1-specific proteases. Studies in mouse determined that Ufsp1 releases Ufm1 (ubiquitin-fold modifier 1) from its bound conjugated complexes which also makes it into an active form. Because the human UFSP1 protein is shorter on the N-terminus and lacks a conserved Cys active site, it is predicted to be non-functional.[provided by RefSeq, Nov 2009].

References